Špela Rozin (born 31 January 1943) is a Slovenian actress that became famous in the cinema of Yugoslavia. Her breakout role was the lead role in the film Strange Girl that became a cult classic because of the modern portrait of a young woman. Špela appeared in more than forty films since 1959 and she was also very popular in Italy because of the many peplum films she made there before coming back to Yugoslavia.

Selected filmography

References

External links 

Špela Rozin Interview - Part 1 (Serbian)
Špela Rozin Interview - Part 2 (Serbian)

1943 births
Living people
Actors from Ljubljana
Slovenian film actresses